King Soopers is a supermarket brand of Kroger located in the Rocky Mountains of the United States. It started as its own brand and, today, is headquartered in Denver, Colorado.

King Soopers has a significant presence in the state of Colorado on the eastern slope of the Rocky Mountains. The stores are located along the Front Range from Cheyenne, Wyoming, to Pueblo, Colorado.  There are also a few locations in the foothills west of Denver and Colorado Springs.

History

Early history 
Lloyd J. King, born April 21, 1906, in Kansas, discharged from the navy in 1947 and in that year, opened the first King Soopers with Charles W. Houchens in Arvada, Colorado. This location has since been demolished for Arvada's Public Library, built in 2005–06.

The name "King Soopers" was derived from Lloyd's family name and an alternate spelling of the word "super!" from the Archie comics series that one of his two sons, Larry, read. Within the next five years, King Soopers became the first grocery store in the country to open an in-store pharmacy and one of the earliest to have a meat department.

Ownership changes 
King Soopers grew to be five (or nine) stores large, including Denver and Colorado Springs before being bought out by Dillon Companies in 1957. The original King Soopers location would be relocated from today-Olde Town Arvada to Arvada Plaza, and that location is still open today.

King Soopers' then-parent, Dillon Companies was bought out by The Kroger Company in late 1982 into '83, and King Soopers and Dillon's are both still owned by Kroger today.

Fresh Fare King Soopers 
In 2012, Kroger expanded its Fresh Fare style of supermarkets into the King Soopers brand, opening the first Fresh Fare King Soopers in Englewood, Colorado. This is a concept that first appeared in Kroger as early as 2007 and actually seems to have started with Ralphs, another Kroger subsidiary primarily located in California in 1998.

The main idea of Fresh Fare is to be a bit more upscale in that it sells more organic foods while still selling traditional groceries; it follows the themes of the 'Green Grocer' Concept.

King Soopers Marketplace 
In 2012, the first King Soopers Marketplace opened, just one year after the first Kroger Marketplace in Texas. As of 2017, there are ten King Soopers Marketplace locations all located in Colorado.

The marketplace concept is much different compared to Fresh Fare; it is based on Fred Meyer stores, (which have spawned multiple Marketplace stores under other Kroger banners), and features an even wider selection of products besides just food and other necessities.

Modern day 
Since King Soopers was started, a rough total of 118 King Soopers were opened, many of which are still open today, and most of which are in Colorado except for one, located in Cheyenne, Wyoming.

References

External links 
 Homepage
 Kroger corporate homepage

1947 establishments in Colorado
Arvada, Colorado
Companies based in Denver
Companies based in Jefferson County, Colorado
Economy of the Southwestern United States
Kroger
Retail companies established in 1947
Supermarkets of the United States